St Joseph's Catholic School is a Catholic primary school in the Mundingburra Area of Townsville, Queensland, Australia. The school  was established in 1924. It is located adjacent to Mundingburra State School. The current principal is Mike Colahan. The systemic school is part of the Roman Catholic Diocese of Townsville.

History 
Mary MacKillop is the patron for this school. MacKillop was a Catholic missionary of the Sisters of St Joseph of the Sacred Heart who established schools for the poor and under-educated people in Australia. Members of the Order still establish schools in MacKillop's name.

Originally, the school was located in a residential area. Since then the school has grown to provide Catholic education to a broad area of North Queensland. It is currently been moved to a new area in Mundingburra and is now a school with over 450 students.

References

External links
 

Catholic primary schools in Queensland
Educational institutions established in 1924
1924 establishments in Australia
Schools in Townsville
Roman Catholic Diocese of Townsville